Codonanthopsis macradenia is a species of flowering plant in the family Gesneriaceae. This species is native to Belize, Colombia, Costa Rica, Guatemala, Honduras, Mexico, and Panamá, and mainly grows in subtropical biomes. Codonanthopsis macradenia was first published in 2013.

References

Gesnerioideae
Flora of Belize
Flora of Colombia
Flora of Costa Rica
Flora of Guatemala
Flora of Honduras
Flora of Mexico
Flora of Panama